KWAM (990 AM) is a commercial radio station in Memphis, Tennessee, featuring a conservative talk radio format known as "The Mighty 990". Owned by Todd Starnes via Starnes Media Group, LLC, the stations serves the Memphis metropolitan area.  KWAM's studios are located in Memphis, while the transmitter is in Marion, Arkansas.   KWAM was founded in 1947 in West Memphis, Arkansas, as KWEM, helping "break" artists such as Elvis Presley, B.B. King, Johnny Cash, Ike Turner and Howlin' Wolf in the late 1940s and 1950s.

By day, KWAM is powered at 10,000 watts.  But because 990 AM is a Canadian clear channel frequency, KWEM must reduce power at night to only 450 watts to avoid interference.  It uses a directional antenna at all times.  Programming is also heard in Memphis and adjacent communities on low-power FM translator W300DE and is available online.

History

Early years
The owners of Little Rock-area radio station KXLR sought to build a statewide network of stations to carry Arkansas Razorbacks football, and they felt that the Memphis area would provide important coverage and exposure for the football program. On May 24, 1946, the West Memphis Broadcasting Company obtained a construction permit to build a new daytime-only station on 990 kHz in West Memphis, Arkansas. After delays, KWEM (990 AM) began operating on February 9, 1947, utilizing studios in the Merchants and Planters Bank Building. The official opening was two weeks later on February 23.

West Memphis was described as the "Las Vegas of the South" in this era, and its programming drew from musicians playing in clubs. Howlin' Wolf had a show on the station from 1949 to 1952, and Sam Phillips heard him and signed him to a contract with Sun Records; his program aired after music by rockabilly guitarist Paul Burlison; B.B. King was first heard over the station, getting his break on a show helmed by Sonny Boy Williamson II; Stax Records founder Jim Stewart started at KWEM, as did James Cotton and Hubert Sumlin; Johnny Cash's first radio broadcast was on KWEM in 1953. The station allowed aspiring performers to pay for 15-minute blocks of air time. Elvis Presley made his first radio appearance on KWEM in 1953, which did not go well because he lacked a band and moved around too much; George Klein worked there as a DJ after its move to Memphis; so did Eddie Bond.

KWEM was purchased by Dee Rivers in 1951. In March 1952, Rivers applied to have the station moved across the Mississippi River to Memphis, Tennessee, which was approved in January 1954; the transmitter site remained in Arkansas. He started the "Dee" Rivers Stations Group, which later owned WEAS-FM in Springfield/Savannah, Georgia, and WGOV (now WGUN) in Valdosta, Georgia, as well as other stations in Georgia and Florida. KWEM held a construction permit to build a channel 48 television station in Memphis, KWEM-TV, but abandoned it in August 1953 because it could not find an adequate site that could house both AM and TV studios and the TV station's transmitter site and did not want this situation to hinder improvements to the radio station. It continued to be an influential hotbed of talent; the transmitter remained on the Arkansas side of the river. This lasted through the end of the decade, when KWEM became KWAM.

Power Boost
On March 31, 1959, Rivers changed the call letters to KWAM as part of a presentation overhaul that did little to change the station's format. The next year, it stopped playing live music. In 1963, the station got FCC permission to boost its power to 10,000 watts, using a directional antenna, but it still could not broadcast after sunset. The transmitter, however, failed and was destroyed in a fire the next year; competitor WLOK loaned equipment to help KWAM return to the air.

The KWEM call letters were later revived for KWEM-LP, a low-power FM station in West Memphis owned by Arkansas State University Mid-South, which serves as a tribute to the KWEM of the late 1940s and 1950s and began broadcasting on FM in 2015 (an earlier version had been established in 2009). The project was led by Dale Franklin, who died in 2017.

Gospel and Religion
In 1968, KWAM began airing Christian talk and teaching shows.  It also sold blocks of time to preachers and played black gospel music. The station already had a history of religious radio programming.  In 1952, a Doctor of Divinity, William Riley, hosted a religious music program on KWEM. In 1981, Dee Rivers Stations acquired FM station KLYX, which was renamed KWAM-FM. At first, it also aired a gospel and religious format like its AM counterpart.  In 1983, the call letters were changed to KRNB, with the station switching to a rhythmic contemporary and disco format, while KWAM continued its gospel sound.

In 1986, KWAM got nighttime authorization. It was allowed to stay on the air after sunset, but at only 450 watts.

Changes in ownership

In February 1996, U.S. Radio announced it would purchase KWAM and the FM station, KJMS, from Rivers. This united the two stations with their principal competitors, WDIA (1070 AM) and WHRK (97.1 FM). One month later, U.S. Radio was purchased by Clear Channel Communications for $140 million.

Clear Channel sold KWAM to Concord Media for $1 million in 2000.  Concord switched KWAM to a talk radio format competing directly against WREC, which Clear Channel (renamed iHeartMedia in 2014) retained. Several years later, KWAM changed hands again, this time bought by Legacy Media, which also owns WEKS, an FM country music station in Zebulon, Georgia, just outside Atlanta. In 2017, Legacy Media added a 250-watt translator for KWAM, W300DE; the next year, Legacy would change the station's branding to "KWAM The Voice - Talk Radio for the Midsouth."

Legacy Media sold KWAM as well as its translator for $685,000 to the upstart Starnes Media Group, LLC, owned by Memphis native Todd Starnes. A conservative American columnist, commentator, author and radio host, Starnes previously worked for Baptist Press and Fox News/Fox News Radio, having departed the latter in October 2019. Upon the close of the purchase on March 31, 2020, Starnes Media Group changed the station's branding to reflect the history of the station, renaming it "The Mighty 990."

Programming
After Tim Van Horn left for station WKIM in late October, 2022, Ben Deeter now hosts the station's morning drive time news and interview show, Wake Up Memphis. The majority of the station's lineup consists of nationally syndicated talk shows and is regarded as the flagship station for owner Todd Starnes's weekday afternoon program.

Other syndicated hosts include Armstrong & Getty, Lars Larson, Sebastian Gorka, Rita Cosby, Bill O'Reilly, Charlie Kirk and "Red Eye Radio."  Weekends feature shows on money, health, guns, gardening, home repair and the outdoors.  Some weekend shows are paid brokered programming.  Most hours begin with an update from Townhall News.

References

External links

Talk radio stations in the United States
Radio stations established in 1947
1947 establishments in Arkansas